RFA Tideflow (A97) was a  of the Royal Fleet Auxiliary.

Commissioned in 1956, the ship was originally named Tiderace, but was renamed Tideflow in 1958 to avoid confusion with other members of the class.

Tideflow was decommissioned in November 1975, and arrived at Bilbao on 10 May 1976 to be broken up.

Tide-class replenishment oilers
1954 ships